The fifteenth and final season of CSI: Crime Scene Investigation premiered on CBS on September 28, 2014, and ended on February 15, 2015. The season stars Ted Danson and Elisabeth Shue.

Plot 
Finlay finds her car rigged to explode ("The CSI Effect") as Sara and Greg are quarantined ("Bad Blood") in the fifteenth and final season of CSI. 

As Russell and Finn are forced to embark on a hunt for the elusive Gig Harbor Killer, their team investigates a final series of gruesome and unusual cases, including a fatal shooting at a marijuana store ("Buzz Kill"), a chemistry experiment gone awry ("The Book of Shadows"), a death at a rehab ("Road to Recovery"), the world of rubber dolls ("Rubbery Homicide"), a murder at a jail ("Let's Make a Deal"), a victim who died twice ("Dead Rails"), and a case that leads the team into the world of aeronautics ("Angle of Attack"). 

Meanwhile, Morgan, Sara and Finn are met with a shootout at a forensics conference ("Girls Gone Wilder"), D.B. turns to Avery Ryan for advice on the psychology of killers ("The Twin Paradox"), and the CSIs reopen a ten-year-old investigation ("Dead Woods"). 

Also this season, a chrome-covered victim perplexes the investigators ("The Last Ride"), the abduction of two teenagers leads to a surprising offer for Nick ("Under My Skin"), murder memorabilia brings back bad memories of the team ("Merchants of Menace"), Stokes leaves Las Vegas, and Finlay is left comatose after coming face to face with the Gig Harbor Killer ("The End Game").

Cast

Main

Recurring 
 Alimi Ballard as Kevin Crawford (episodes 2, 3, 4, 10, 11, 13, 16)
 Larry M. Mitchell as Officer Mitchell (episodes 3, 4, 8, 14, 15, 17, 18)
 Marc Vann as Conrad Ecklie (episodes 1, 5, 17, 18)
 Mark Valley as Daniel Shaw (episodes 1, 6, 13, 18)
 Mark-Paul Gosselaar as Jared Briscoe and Paul Winthrop (episodes 1, 6, 13, 18)

Guest stars 
 Floriana Lima as Keri Torres (episode 6)
 Patricia Arquette as Avery Ryan (episode 6)
 Sharon Osbourne as Elise Massey (episode 10)
 Lisa Rinna as Tori Nolan (episode 17)
 Brett Cullen as John Nolan (episode 17)

Changes 
George Eads departed the main cast at the end of this season, and later confirmed that he would not return for the series-ending movie, resulting in some minor changes to the script. Elisabeth Shue would not return either. Patricia Arquette guest stars as Avery Ryan.

Production
In June 2014, it was announced that showrunner Carol Mendelsohn would be leaving the show after 14 years. Speaking to The Hollywood Reporter, Mendelsohn stated, "It's been a long and amazing journey, and I am so proud of CSI'''s continued success. In handing over the helm to my dear friend and partner, Don McGill, I know he and our CSI team will carry on brilliantly what we've all created together. CSI'', its cast and crew, writers and directors, will always be my family. I have learned so much from each and every one of them. About writing, producing and life. For that, and so much more, I am forever grateful." Don McGill became the lone showrunner for season fifteen. Starting with this season, the show moved to Sundays at 10:00 p.m, except for episode 16, which had a special Tuesday at 10:00 p.m. airing on January 27, 2015.

Episodes

Notes

Ratings

Broadcast
The season airs simultaneously on CTV in Canada. It premiered on Channel 5 in the United Kingdom on January 24, 2015.

References

General references

External links
 

15
2014 American television seasons
2015 American television seasons